Emanuele Buzzi (born 27 October 1994) is an Italian World Cup alpine ski racer and specializes in the speed events of Downhill and Super G, and made his World Cup debut in December 2014. He competed at the World Championships in 2017 and 2021 and the 2018 Winter Olympics.

Career
On 19 December 2014, Buzzi made his World Cup debut at the Val Gardena downhill, and finished fiftieth. In 2016, he scored his first World Cup points on 6 February in South Korea at the Jeongseon downhill, in 25th place.

World Cup results

Season standings

Top ten finishes
 0 podiums; 4 top tens (3 DH, 1 SG)

World Championship results

Olympic results

References

External links
 
 
 Italian Winter Sports Federation – (FISI) – alpine skiing – Emanuele Buzzi – 

1994 births
Living people
Italian male alpine skiers
Alpine skiers at the 2018 Winter Olympics
Olympic alpine skiers of Italy
Alpine skiers of Centro Sportivo Carabinieri
21st-century Italian people